The UT Martin Skyhawks men's basketball team is the men's basketball team that represents the University of Tennessee at Martin in Martin, Tennessee, United States. The school's team currently competes in the Ohio Valley Conference.

Division I postseason

NIT results
The Skyhawks have appeared in the National Invitation Tournament (NIT) one time. Their record is 0–1.

CIT results
The Skyhawks have appeared in the CollegeInsider.com Postseason Tournament (CIT) three times. Their record is 5–3.

References

External links